Arizona Charlie's may refer to:

 Arizona Charlie's Boulder, a casino hotel in the Paradise area of Las Vegas, Nevada, open since 2001
 Arizona Charlie's Decatur, a casino hotel in the Charleston Heights area of Las Vegas, Nevada, open since 1988

See also
 Arizona Charlie (1859–1932), American showman and sharpshooter, namesake of the hotels